Tseng-yu Tsai is a Taiwanese billionaire.

Early life 
Tsai is a son of Tsai Wan-lin, and brother to Tsai Hong-tu and Tsai Cheng-da.

Education 
Tsai has a bachelor's degree from Tokao University. Tsai has an MBA from National Taiwan University.

Career 
Tsai sold his share of the family business in 2010, and founded his own company, Homax Equity. Forbes valued Tsai's fortune at $2 billion in March 2016.

In 2018, at 65 years old, Tsai is ranked #13 in Forbes' Taiwan's 50 Richest 2018. In 2018, Tsai is ranked #1103 in Forbes' Billionaire 2018.

Personal life 
Tsai is married and has one child.

See also 
 The World's Billionaires

References

Living people
Taiwanese billionaires
Taiwanese real estate businesspeople
Taiwanese company founders
Tsai family of Miaoli
Year of birth missing (living people)